Elaeodendron transvaalense (Burtt Davy) R.H.Archer (bushveld saffron, Lepelhout, or  Oupitjie) is a protected tree in South Africa. It also occurs in other Southern African countries like Angola, Namibia, Botswana, Zambia, Zimbabwe, Eswatini and Mozambique.

References

transvaalensis
Protected trees of South Africa
Flora of South Tropical Africa
Trees of Angola
Trees of Botswana
Flora of Namibia
Flora of Swaziland